Jean-Bernard Restout (22 February 1732 – 18 July 1797) was a French painter.

Life

Restout was born and died in Paris.  A son of Jean II Restout and like him a member of the Académie de Rouen, he won the Prix de Rome in 1758 and was aggregated to the Académie royale on his return from Italy in 1765, then received into it in 1769. However, he refused to conform to its rules led to a quarrel.

He frequently exhibited at the Salon de Paris from 1767 to 1791. On the French Revolution, he was president of the Commune des Arts which campaigned, with its founder David, for the suppression of the Académie.

Made guardian of the Garde-Meuble royal by Roland during the Revolution, this favour nearly cost him his life during the Reign of Terror when Roland and his friends were implicated in the theft from the Garde-Meuble. Suspected, he was imprisoned and only released after the 9 Thermidor coup d'etat (27 July 1794) that deposed Robespierre.

Bibliography

 Galerie française ou Portraits des hommes et des femmes célébres qui ont paru en France, Paris, Herrissant le Fils, 1771
 Anatole Granges de Surgères, Artistes français des XVIIe et XVIIIe siècles (1681-1787), Paris, Charavay, 1893

References

External links 
 Jean-Bernard Restout on Artcyclopedia

18th-century French painters
French male painters
People of the French Revolution
Prix de Rome for painting
1732 births
1797 deaths
18th-century French male artists